Constitutional Amendment 2 of 1998 amended the Constitution of Hawaii, granting the state legislature the power to prevent same-sex marriage from being conducted or recognized in Hawaii.  Amendment 2 was the first constitutional amendment adopted in the United States that specifically targeted same-sex partnerships.

In 1993, the Hawaii State Supreme Court ruled in Baehr v. Lewin, that refusing to grant marriage licenses to same-sex couples was discriminatory under that state's constitution. However, the court did not immediately order the state to begin issuing marriage licenses to same-sex couples; rather, it remanded the case to the trial court and ordered the state to justify its position.  After the trial court judge rejected the state's justifications for limiting marriage to opposite-sex couples in 1996 (but stayed his ruling to allow the state to appeal to the Supreme Court again), the Hawaii State Legislature passed a proposed constitutional amendment during the 1997 session that would overrule the Supreme Court's 1993 ruling and allow the Legislature to ban same-sex marriage.  This constitutional amendment appeared on the 1998 general election ballot as Constitutional Amendment 2.

The question that appeared on the ballot for voters was:

Amendment 2 differed from amendments that followed in other states in that it did not write a ban on same-sex marriage into the state's constitution; rather, it allowed the state legislature to enact such a ban. On November 3, 1998, Hawaii voters approved the amendment by a vote of 69.2–28.6%, and the state legislature exercised its power to ban same-sex marriage.

The language added by the amendment reads:

On October 14, 2013, Hawaii Attorney General David M. Louie stated in a formal legal opinion that Amendment 2 does not prevent the state legislature from legalizing same-sex marriage, which it did in November 2013 with the Hawaii Marriage Equality Act.

Results of vote

References

See also
 LGBT rights in Hawaii
 Same-sex marriage in Hawaii

U.S. state constitutional amendments banning same-sex unions
1998 in LGBT history
LGBT rights in Hawaii
Same-sex marriage ballot measures in the United States
1998 Hawaii elections
1998 ballot measures
Hawaii ballot measures